The men's bi-fins 100 m event in finswimming at the 2022 World Games took place on 8 July 2022 at the Birmingham Crossplex in Birmingham, United States.

Competition format
A total of 8 athletes entered the competition. Only final was held.

Results

Final

References 

Finswimming at the 2022 World Games